The Helpmann Award for Best Cabaret Performer is an award, presented at the annual Helpmann Awards since 2010. It recognises excellence in cabaret performance in Australia by a performer and/or group in a work created or co-created by the performer/group.

Winners and nominees

Source:

See also
Helpmann Awards

References

External links
The official Helpmann Awards website

C